Geoffrey Chitty Latham (15 March 1887 – 23 September 1980) was an English first-class cricketer and colonial administrator.

The son of the cricketer and judge Thomas Latham, he was born in China in March 1887. He was educated at Winchester College, before going up to Magdalen College, Oxford. While studying at Oxford, he made a single appearance in first-class cricket for Oxford University against Sussex at Eastbourne in 1907. Batting twice in the match, he was run out for 22 runs in the Oxford first innings, while in their second innings he was dismissed for 3 runs by George Cox. 

After graduating from Oxford, Latham joined the Colonial Service in 1910. During the First World War he was a lieutenant in the Northern Rhodesia Police and was decorated by France with the Légion d'honneur in August 1917. He was appointed the first inspector of schools in Northern Rhodesia in 1920. In April 1924, Latham was made director of the newly created sub-department for native education in Northern Rhodesia. Despite his opposition to the introduction of film to native Rhodesians, in case it became politicized as it had in British India, Latham changed his stance in the early 1930s in an effort to expand and improve native education. Latham died at Waverley Abbey House near Farnham in September 1980. His son was the artist John Latham.

References

External links

1887 births
1980 deaths
People from Shanghai
People educated at Winchester College
Alumni of Magdalen College, Oxford
English cricketers
Oxford University cricketers
Colonial Service officers
British colonial police officers
British Army personnel of World War I
Chevaliers of the Légion d'honneur
British expatriates in China